The 1929 Bucknell Bison football team was an American football team that represented Bucknell University as an independent during the 1929 college football season. In its third season under head coach Carl Snavely, the team compiled an 8–2 record.

The team played its home games at Memorial Stadium in Lewisburg, Pennsylvania.

Schedule

References

Bucknell
Bucknell Bison football seasons
Bucknell Bison football